Lee Mason is an Australian film, television and stage actor from Melbourne. He is probably best known for his lead role in The Independent as naive independent politician Marty Browning. This role garnered Mason many favourable reviews, with James Brown of FilmInk describing Marty as "the most charming protagonist since Kenny".
Recently awarded Best Actor in two major Film Festivals in 2016, Lee Mason has proved a unique character actor capable of lead roles and also memorable cameos. He has worked steadily in the Australian film industry for the last 10 years. He has worked as a director, writer and producer. He is perhaps best known for his portrayal of Marty Browning in The Independent and more recently Raskolnikov in Crime and Punishment.
Mason's most recent work is a production of Glengarry Glen Ross at the Chapel Off Chapel theatre in Prahran.

Filmography
  The Unlit (filming) 
Terrence Walker
  How Do You Know Chris? (post-production) 
Ray
  The Debt Collector (post-production) 
Black Douglas
  Choir Girl (completed) 
Julius
  Stung (Short) (completed) 
Max
 2012 PMS Superpowers! (Short) (completed) 
Mr. Purple
 2018 A Beautiful Request (Short) 
Nick
 2018 The Age of Imitation 
Mr. Parker
 2017 Dirty Bird (Short) 
Ray
 2016 The Sound of Love (Short) 
Hubert
 2016 The Death and Life of Otto Bloom 
Male Newsreader
 2015/I Crime and Punishment 
Raskolnikov
 2015/III Hit (Short) 
Doctor Granek
 2014 Nothing to Write Home About (Short) 
Supermarket Customer
 2014 The Suburbs Go on Forever (Short) 
Mr. Parker
 2014 Dead Weights and Balloons (Short) 
Robert
 2013 Donkey in a Lion's Cage (Short) 
Rabble man
 2013 Captain Cone (Short) 
Captain Cone
 2013 Underbelly (TV Series) 
Eugene Gorman
- Squizzy Cooks a Goose (2013) ... Eugene Gorman
- Squizzy Tempts Fate (2013) ... Eugene Gorman
- Squizzy Puts One Over (2013) ... Eugene Gorman*Parallels (2005)
Great Times in Rehab (short 2007)
The Trial of Film (short 2007)
The Independent (2007)
Making Plans for Roland (short 2008)
Pontos (short 2008)
GFC: Gunpoint Finance Creditor (short 2009)
Thank God You're Here (TV series 2009)
Satisfaction (TV series 2009)
City Homicide (TV series 2011)
Black Pine Road (short 2010)

References

External links

Living people
Year of birth missing (living people)
Australian male film actors
Australian male stage actors
Male actors from Melbourne